Stormy is the cyclonic costumed mascot for Lake Erie College.

Origin of Stormy
In the winter of 1994, Lake Erie College held a contest for a new mascot for the 1994-95 academic year. The contest was published within the Alumni magazine to determine a new mascot for the college. As a result of this contest, the current mascot of the College, Stormy, was born.

See also
 List of college mascots in the United States

References

College mascots in the United States
Mascots introduced in 1994